The XXVIII. ADAC 1000Km Rennen Nürburgring was an endurance race held at the Nürburgring Nordschleife on May 30, 1982. It was Round 3 of the 1982 World Sportscar Championship. The event was won by the No. 50 Martini Racing Lancia LC1 driven by Michele Alboreto, Teo Fabi, and Riccardo Patrese.

Results
Class winners are denoted in bold.

Notes
 Pole position: #7 Zakspeed Ford C100 (Manfred Winkelhock) - 7:16.570

References

6 Hours of Nürburgring
Nuerburgring
Nurburgring
Nurburgring